Rapid Run Park is an urban park in the Price Hill neighborhood of Cincinnati, Ohio, United States.

The park features a lake with a stone park shelter, built in 1941. There are hiking paths along the hilly terrain, a playground, and a baseball diamond.

References

Parks in Cincinnati